Vibrissina is a genus of flies in the family Tachinidae.

Species
Vibrissina aberrans (Wulp, 1890)
Vibrissina albopicta (Bigot, 1889)
Vibrissina angustifrons Shima, 1983
Vibrissina aurata Shima, 1983
Vibrissina aurifrons (Curran, 1930)
Vibrissina bilineata (Wulp, 1890)
Vibrissina bridwelli (Aldrich, 1931)
Vibrissina buckelli (Curran, 1926)
Vibrissina candicans (Wulp, 1890)
Vibrissina carinata (Wulp, 1890)
Vibrissina curva (Wulp, 1890)
Vibrissina danmartini Fleming & Wood, 2017
Vibrissina debilitata (Pandellé, 1896)
Vibrissina dieloceri (Townsend, 1942)
Vibrissina dolopis (Reinhard, 1958)
Vibrissina erecta (Aldrich, 1931)
Vibrissina fasciata (Wulp, 1890)
Vibrissina forticula (Wulp, 1890)
Vibrissina hallwachsorum Fleming & Wood, 2017
Vibrissina hylotomae (Coquillett, 1898)
Vibrissina inca (Townsend, 1927)
Vibrissina insecta (Giglio-Tos, 1893)
Vibrissina inthanon Shima, 1983
Vibrissina itaquaquecetubae (Townsend, 1929)
Vibrissina leibyi (Townsend, 1916)
Vibrissina leida (Wulp, 1890)
Vibrissina mexicana (Aldrich, 1931)
Vibrissina mucorea (Wulp, 1890)
Vibrissina nigriventris (Smith, 1917)
Vibrissina obscura (Aldrich, 1931)
Vibrissina prospheryx (Townsend, 1935)
Vibrissina rafaela (Townsend, 1917)
Vibrissina randycurtisi Fleming & Wood, 2017
Vibrissina randyjonesi Fleming & Wood, 2017
Vibrissina remota (Wulp, 1890)
Vibrissina robertwellsi Fleming & Wood, 2017
Vibrissina scita (Walker, 1853)
Vibrissina spinigera (Townsend, 1915)
Vibrissina texensis (Aldrich, 1931)
Vibrissina turrita (Meigen, 1824)
Vibrissina vaciva (Wulp, 1890)
Vibrissina vicina (Wulp, 1890)
Vibrissina zonata (Bigot, 1889)

References

Diptera of Asia
Diptera of Europe
Diptera of North America
Diptera of South America
Exoristinae
Tachinidae genera
Taxa named by Camillo Rondani